John Earle is a retired American football player. Earle played for two seasons in the Canadian Football League for the Baltimore Stallions as a guard and center.

Raised in Keyport, New Jersey, Earle graduated from Keyport High School in 1987.

Life after football
In 1997, Earle turned down a contract to go to the Washington Redskins. After playing five years of professional football, Earle began working with youth with "Team Impact" and Sportsworld. As a member of Sportsworld, Earle speaks in high schools all around the country. Earle also serves as an assistant football coach of the West Prairie/LaHarpe Cyclones.

In 2008, moved to Gainesville, Texas, to become a local student minister at the First Baptist Church.

On December 1, 2010, Earle began working as a youth minister in Colleyville, Texas at First Baptist Church Colleyville.

References

External links
Bio at Outreach Speakers
John Earle visits Cibola County

1968 births
Living people
People from Keyport, New Jersey
Players of American football from New Jersey
Players of Canadian football from New Jersey
Sportspeople from Monmouth County, New Jersey
American football offensive tackles
Western Illinois Leathernecks football players
Cincinnati Bengals players
Kansas City Chiefs players
New England Patriots players
Atlanta Falcons players
Baltimore Stallions players
St. Louis Rams players